In statistics, a k-statistic is a minimum-variance unbiased estimator of a cumulant.

See also
 k-Statistic on Wolfram MathWorld
 kStatistics, an R package for calculating k-statistics

Estimator